Warren Turner is a pioneering American gasser drag racer.

Driving a Chrysler-powered Allard, he won NHRA's first ever A/SP national title at Great Bend, Kansas in 1955. (His elapsed time was not recorded or has not been preserved.)

References

Sources
Davis, Larry. Gasser Wars, North Branch, MN:  Cartech, 2003.

Dragster drivers
American racing drivers